Kiewit is a railway station in Kiewit, close to the city of Hasselt, Limburg, Belgium. The station opened on 28 May 1974 and is located on line 21A. The station was closed on 3 June 1984 and reopened on 28 May 1989. The train services are operated by National Railway Company of Belgium (NMBS).

The station was opened close to the location of the Philips factory in an attempt to reduce the congestion caused by people travelling to work at the factory by car. The station is also used by students travelling to nearby schools and people travelling to the Pukkelpop music festival.

Train services
The station is served by the following services:

Intercity services (IC-03) Blankeberge/Knokke - Bruges - Ghent - Brussels - Leuven - Hasselt - Genk

See also
 List of railway stations in Belgium

References

External links
 
 Kiewit railway station at Belgian Railways website

Railway stations in Belgium
Railway stations opened in 1972
Railway stations in Limburg (Belgium)